Novo Selo is a village in the municipality of Mavrovo and Rostuša, North Macedonia.

Demographics
According to the 2002 census, the village had a total of 33 inhabitants. Ethnic groups in the village include:

Macedonians 33

References

Villages in Mavrovo and Rostuša Municipality